Breitfuss, or Breitfuß is a surname.

As a surname 
 Friedrich Breitfuss (1851–1911), Russian philatelist
 Leonid Breitfuss, German polar explorer for whom Breitfuss Glacier is named

As a given name 
 Simon Breitfuss Kammerlander, Bolivian-Austrian ski racer